French Prairie is located in Marion County, Oregon, United States, in the Willamette Valley between the Willamette River and the Pudding River, north of Salem. It was named for some of the earliest settlers of that part of the Oregon Country, French Canadian/Métis people who were mostly former employees of the Hudson's Bay Company.
"French Prairie" naming was first captured in writing in the early 1850s by a French Consul to California visiting Oregon. Pierre Charles Fournier de Saint-Amant referred to the area as "les prairies françaises".
French Prairie is also known as an early Métis settlement in the Pacific Northwest history.

History

Early settlement (non-Indigenous)
Wallace House was first established in 1812 by William Wallace Matthews and John C. Halsley. The Pacific Fur Company
temporary outpost of Fort Astoria was located at the southern end of French Prairie, North of present-day city of Salem, Oregon. The Willamette Trading Post was established in 1814 by the North West Company near the site of Champoeg.

By 1829, Étienne Lucier was establishing a land claim nearby and starting to  settle and retire with the help of its Hudson's Bay Company employer. Lucier was soon joined settling with Joseph Gervais (1831), Pierre Belleque (1833) and many more in following years.

By 1836, sixteen Roman Catholic French Canadian settlers representing a group of 77 were petitioning Norbert Provencher, the Bishop of Juliopolis at the Red River Colony (present-day Winnipeg, Manitoba, Canada) to have a priest sent to them. Bishop François Norbert Blanchet finally arrived in 1838. These first French Canadian settlers built hewn log homes in the French style and started wheat farms. The homes were built with clay and stick chimneys, ash bark roofs, and animal skin windows that were similar to the homes built on the eastern Canadian frontier. By 1843, approximately 100 French Canadian/Métis families lived on the prairie.

The St. Paul Roman Catholic Church, in St. Paul, was built in 1846 by the original settlers of French Prairie and is the oldest brick building still standing in the Pacific Northwest.

Later settlement
For a short time in the 1880s the Oregonian Railway Company had a station named French Prairie about two miles southeast of the city of St. Paul.

French Prairie today
The French Prairie area is still an important agricultural area of the Willamette Valley, and there is concern about urban development encroaching on arable land.

Geography
Generally, the French Prairie is bounded by the Pudding River on the east, the Salem-Keizer metropolitan area on the south, and the Willamette River on both the north and west as the Willamette makes a 90 degree turn to the south near Newberg. Settlements on French Prairie founded by French Canadians include Butteville, Champoeg, Gervais, Saint Louis, and St. Paul.

Notable residents
 Pierre Belleque
 Marie Aioe Dorion
 Joseph Gervais
 Michel Laframboise
 Étienne Lucier
 François X. Matthieu

References

External links
 List of Settlers West of Rockies, 1842 by Elijah White, Indian Agent
 French Canadians in the 1842 Oregon census (has detailed biographies of some of the settlers)
 Historic photos from the French Prairie area from Salem Public Library
 Friends of French Prairie land-use planning organization

Agriculture in Oregon
Champoeg Meetings
French-Canadian American history
Geography of Marion County, Oregon
Grasslands of Oregon
Métis in the United States
Oregon Country
Prairies
Pre-statehood history of Oregon
Regions of Oregon